H. australis  may refer to:
 Haageocereus australis,  the Quisco De La Costa De Aric, a cactus species endemic to southern Peru and northern Chile
 Hemiandra australis, a shrub species in the genus Hemiandra found in Australia
 Hoya australis, the waxvine or common waxflower, a plant species found in Australia

See also
 Australis (disambiguation)